Art Washington is an American television writer-producer-director based in Los Angeles, California. Films and television he has written for include Percy & Thunder, Air America, and MacGyver.

Washington is a proponent and founder of the "Native Black American" distinction/movement. It is his belief that "Native Black American" or simply "Black American" should be used instead of "African American" when referring to Black Americans whose family/direct ancestors have been in America for centuries; dating back to their criminal human abduction and captivity/"slavery" (1581; St. Augustine, Florida).

References

External links

American television writers
Television producers from California
American television directors
Living people
Year of birth missing (living people)
Place of birth missing (living people)
Writers from Los Angeles
Screenwriters from California